People who walk across Australia are those who have walked from either of the geographical extremes of the continent or from directly opposite cities on opposite shores.

The extremes of Australia are geographically considered to be Steep Point (West), Cape Byron (East), Cape York Peninsula (North), and South East Cape (South). The directly opposite cities are geographically considered to be Perth (West), Brisbane (East), Darwin (North), and Hobart (South). 

Walkers who choose to circumnavigate Australia can follow the National Highway for large sections of their journey. Of the people who have successfully circumnavigated the continent, it took a range of 365–897 days to complete.

Only seven people are known to have completed solo unaccompanied circumnavigations, passing through all mainland states and territories, without a support vehicle. These include Aidan de Brune, Nobby Young, Colin Ricketts, Andrew 'Cad' Cadigan, Scott Loxley, Mike Pauly, and Terra Roam.

Completed journeys
The names of the individuals who have walked across Australia have been listed below in chronological order. Sources for data contained within this table have been listed within the body of the article, or where not readily available, directly from the individual concerned.

‡ Karumba did not exist upon Burke, Wills and King arriving. The site of the town however is widely accepted as the northernmost destination of the Victorian Exploring Expedition.

Robert Burke

Robert O'Hara Burke was an Irish soldier and police officer, who achieved fame as an Australian explorer. He was the leader of the ill-fated Burke and Wills expedition, which was the first expedition to cross Australia from south to north. The expedition left Melbourne on 20 August 1860 with a total of 19 men, 27 camels, and 23 horses. Burke, along with William Wills, John King, and Charley Gray, reached the mangroves on the estuary of the Flinders River near where the town of Normanton now stands, on 9 February 1861. Flooding rains and swamps meant they never saw open ocean. Upon returning, the expedition was weakened by starvation and exposure, and was hampered by the tropical monsoon downpours of the wet season. Burke died at a place now called Burke's Waterhole on Cooper Creek in South Australia. The exact date of Burke's death is uncertain, but has generally been accepted to be 28 June 1861.

William Wills

William Wills was a member of the famous Victorian Exploring Expedition. He was originally appointed as third-in-command, surveyor, astronomical and meteorological observer of the expedition in July 1860 on a salary of £300 a year. The expedition left Melbourne on 20 August 1860 with a total of 19 men, 27 camels and 23 horses. They reached Menindee on 16 October 1860 where Landells resigned following an argument with Burke, where Wills was promoted to second-in-command. Burke, along with William Wills, John King, and Charley Gray, reached the mangroves on the estuary of the Flinders River near where the town of Normanton now stands, on 9 February 1861. Flooding rains and swamps meant they never saw open ocean. Upon returning, the expedition was weakened by starvation and exposure, and was hampered by the tropical monsoon downpours of the wet season. Wills died alone at a place called Breerily Waterhole on Cooper Creek in South Australia while waiting for rescue. Burke died soon after. The exact date of their deaths is unknown, but has generally been accepted to be 28 June 1861.

John King

John King was an Irish soldier who achieved fame as an Australian explorer. He was responsible for the welfare of the camels used during the Burke and Wills expedition who reached the Gulf of Carpentaria. King was the sole survivor of the four men of the expedition, and survived with the help of Aborigines until he was found on 15 September by Edwin Welch – the surveyor in Alfred William Howitt's Victorian Contingent Party. King returned to Melbourne and was hailed as a hero. King never fully recovered from the expedition, and died prematurely of pulmonary tuberculosis on 15 January 1872 aged 33.

Aidan De Brune

Aidan De Brune was a pseudonym of Herbert Charles Cull, who was born in London in 1874. He married in 1907, but in 1910, he left his wife and infant son Lionel, arriving in Fremantle, in October 1910. On 24 November 1920, he commenced a walk from Fremantle to Sydney, arriving in Sydney on 21 February 1921. He later worked for the Sydney Daily Mail.

Bob and Bill Mossel, Sue Thompson, Annabel Douglas-Hill and Sharka Dolak

This walk was undertaken to raise funds for the Royal Flying Doctor Service and partly followed in the steps of the Burke & Wills Victorian Exploring Expedition, camping at some of the Burke & Wills expedition's dig trees. It is the first documented crossing of the Australian continent entirely by foot and first by a woman. A feature-length movie Feet Across Australia was shown on national television and attracted paying audiences at many venues in Australia. 1973 was a very wet season and mud was a major problem on the Birdsville Track. Food was buried along the route in advance, otherwise all equipment was carried by the 5 team members with a small handcart. A camel from Arkaroola Sanctuary was briefly part of the expedition. There was no support team accompanying the walkers.

Dave Kunst

Dave Kunst is the first person verified to have walked around the Earth. Kunst's trek began 20 June 1970 and ended 5 October 1974 (the dates in the table reflect his arrival and departure from Australia). During their travels, the brothers collected donations to UNICEF. Unfortunately, John (Dave's brother who was also walking with him) was killed when bandits shot him in the mountains of Afghanistan in October 1972. Dave was also shot in the chest during the same attack, but survived by playing dead. After spending 4 months recovering from his injuries, Dave resumed his journey along with his brother Pete, from the spot where John was killed. As they continued their travels, Dave and Pete were denied access to the USSR, so they flew from India to Australia. Pete returned home during the Australia-leg of the trek, where Dave continued on alone, by this time on his 3rd mule. Unfortunately, the mule died and Dave was left hauling his wagon of supplies himself. He was on the verge of abandoning his supplies, when he fortuitously met Jenni Samuel, a schoolteacher from Perth. She helped pull his wagon with her car, while he walked alongside. Dave returned to Australia for a year after completing his journey. Jenni and Dave later married and are still together as of 2008.

Dennis Bartell
Denis Bartell became the first person to walk across the Simpson Desert unassisted in 1984, whilst walking across Australia from the Gulf of Carpentaria to Gulf St Vincent. He followed the 'French Line' – a route taken by the CGG surveyor Roy Elkins 21 years prior who also completed the walk but with the assistance of a support crew. In recognition of his achievement, he was named the Australian Geographic's Adventurer of the Year in 1995.

Steven Newman
Listed in the Guinness Book of Records as the first person to walk around the world solo, Steve Newman crossed 20 countries and walked some 15,000 miles during his four-year journey. For the Australian leg, Steven flew from Bali and commenced his walk in Darwin on 1 July 1985. He travelled south along "The Track" through Alice Springs, Coober Pedy, Adelaide, and on to Melbourne. He concluded in Melbourne on 20 June 1986, before proceeding onto Vancouver for his American leg of the journey.

Steven later published a book documenting his journey in 1989 called 'Worldwalk'. The handmade cart he used to cross the deserts was named 'Roo' and is currently on display at a museum in the USA. His backpack 'Clinger' and the tattered boots he wore across Australia were temporarily displayed in the Smithsonian after his record-setting solo walk around the world was completed.

Roger Scott
Roger Scott departed from Darwin for Dover on 6 August 1988, raising funds for the Top End Life Education Centre and the NT Spastics Association. He walked via Kununurra and Halls Creek, arriving at the Eyre Bird Observatory on the southern coast of South Australia on 22 September 1988 where he encountered Ffyona Campbell on her walk across Australia. He then proceeded on to Adelaide, before catching a flight to Devonport and walking to Dover. He completed the walk in 109 days, and traversed the Great Sandy Desert, Gibson Desert, Great Victoria Desert, and Nullarbor Plain on his journey.

Ffyona Campbell

Starting from John O'Groats on the northernmost coast of Scotland in 1983, then 16-year-old Ffyona Campbell set out to walk around the world. She departed from Sydney on 11 September 1988, and arrived in Fremantle on 14 December 1988 – a journey lasting 95 days. She completed the journey with David Richard, who acted as her support crew and who waited for her every 10 miles.

Her entire journey around the world took a little over eleven years to complete. She completed 31,529 km and raised £120,000 for charity.

Nobby Young
Through 1993–94, Nobby Young became the only person to walk around mainland Australia, since Aidan de Brune accomplished the feat in 1922–1924. The 16,000-kilometre journey, which took exactly a year to complete, is listed in the Guinness Book of Records. He covered a distance of 14,900 km, whilst raising funds for the 'Life Education Centre'.

David Mason
In 1998, David Mason walked from Byron Bay to Dalby, where he picked up three camels that would carry his supplies. From there, he walked through the Simpson Desert to Uluru, then across the Gibson Desert to Steep Point. He completed the walk in 236 days, whilst raising money for the Fred Hollows Foundation. In recognition of his achievement, he was named the Australian Geographic Adventurer of the Year in 1999. David Mason wrote a book about the walk that was published in 2014 and titled Walk Across Australia: The First Solo Crossing.

Andrew Harper
In 1999, Andrew Harper followed the Tropic of Capricorn from west to east accompanied by three camels to carry his supplies. The desert sections of his journey represented pure desert travel as he did not follow any roads or tracks enabling him to keep as true to the TOC as possible. This included traverses of the Little Sandy, Gibson and Simpson Deserts. The expedition was a fundraising walk for the Royal Flying Doctor Service and as recognition for his achievement, he was admitted as a Fellow to the Royal Geographical Society.

Polly Letofsky
On 1 August 1999, Polly Letofsky left her home in Colorado on a five-year journey spanning four continents and 22 countries. She started her leg across Australia on 29 October 2000 from St Kilda Pier on Port Phillip Bay in Melbourne, and concluded on 22 July 2001 after arriving in Port Douglas.

Jon Muir

On 18 May 2001, Jon Muir walked across Australia with his dog, a Jack Russell Terrier named Seraphine, from Port Augusta to Burketown. It took him 128 days, spanning a distance of approximately 2,500 km. Jon's walk is unique in that he remained self-sufficient for food and water, hauling, gathering, or hunting all of his food for the walk. He filmed his journey and produced a documentary entitled Alone Across Australia.

Dave McKern

On 15 June 2003, McKern started his solo journey walking across Australia, from Sydney to Perth while only being accompanied by his dog Rupert, he finished on 8 November 2003 after a total of 146 days on the road covering a total of approximately 4000 km.

Deborah De Williams
Deborah De Williams walked around Australia in 2003/2004. She aimed to break the record set by Nobby Young (who was also on her support team), the first person to walk around Australia back in 1993/1994. She broke the record on 23 September 2004. She is the first woman to walk completely around Australia.

John Olsen
John Olsen has walked across Australia twice, between the northern and southernmost points, and the western and easternmost points.

His first journey commenced in 2004. Olsen walked  unsupported from Cape York Peninsula to Tasmania in 167 days, and raised a little over $10,000 for a charity working with children with cerebral palsy. On 18 June 2008, John Olsen undertook his second walk, walking from Steep Point, to Cape Byron. He then walked home to Geelong after reaching Cape Byron.. The progress of Olsen's second journey was broadcast by Ian McNamara’s ABC radio Australia All Over program on Sundays. Olsen completed the walk in 200 days, finishing on 3 January 2009.

Olsen's accomplishment was recognised by Sensis when it depicted him on the cover of the Geelong and Colac Yellow and White Pages directories for 2010/2011

Colin Ricketts
Colin Ricketts walked solo walk around Australia raising money for kids with cancer. He departed Adelaide on 4 January 2005, returning 15,430 km and 379 days later on 17 January 2006. He pushed a three-wheel baby jogger named 'Wilson' and followed National Highway 1 in an anti-clockwise direction.

Jeff Johnson
On 5 April 2007, Jeff Johnson walked from Port Augusta to Karumba to raise money for the DeafBlind Association of NSW. Motivated by the then recent death of his deaf-blind niece, he raised approximately $5,700 for the charity towards the purchase of a bus for transport of deaf and blind children using wheelchairs. He completed the walk in 151 days, finishing on 2 September 2007.

Deanna Sorensen
Deanna Sorensen is a Canadian veterinary nurse and motivational speaker. After leaving Perth and crossing the Nullarbor, she travelled south from Port Augusta to Adelaide, along the coast through Mount Gambier to Melbourne, then up the Princes Highway through Eden to Sydney. The total distance of this route, taken from road maps and routemarkers, is 4895 km; with an additional 170 km of additional distance on side-roads and excursions making her total journey a little over 5000 km. She completed her journey in 180 days.

Michael Mitchell
Michael Mitchell left Cape York on 5 May 2008 on his 'Great Australian Cancer Bush Walk'. He aimed to raise $1 million for cancer research, and was motivated to act because some friends and their siblings (Mick and Maree Egan and Michael's mother, Monica) were living with cancer. He followed the National Bicentennial Trail and The Australian Alps Walking Track for a large portion of his journey.

Michael was able to raise $50,000 for the Cancer Council. The walk was completed in the aftermath of the Black Saturday bushfires. He finished on 3 May 2009 upon arriving at Wilsons Promontory.

Gary Hause
Gary Hause departed from Cairns on 19 May 2008, and arrived in Torquay on 2 November 2008. The leg across Australia was completed as part of his journey around the world on foot.

Dave Leaning
Dave Leaning walked south to north leaving Port Augusta on 28 April 2009 and arriving in Karumba on 21 July. This followed the Englishman's feat of skiing the length of Norway. The effort was made to raise funds for the Halo Trust.

Mike Pauly
Mike decided he would walk from his home in Fremantle to Federation Square in Melbourne via Coolgardie after being diagnosed with osteoarthritis in both knees as a result of being overweight, and reading of Deanna Sorenson's account of walking unsupported across the Nullarbor. He vowed to complete the walk before his 70th birthday, in a bid to raise funds and awareness for Arthritis WA.

On 16 May 2009, at sixty-nine years old, Mike set off on his lone 3617 km journey walking across the Nullarbor.

Dave Phoenix
In 2008, Dave Phoenix walked from Melbourne to Karumba following the route taken by Burke and Wills in 1860–1.

Mark Gibbens
Mark Gibbens left Perth on 22 February 2009, and arrived at Civic Park in Sydney on Monday 18 May 2009. He walked solo for 5200 km in 86 days using his mate Colin Rickett's buggy named "Wilson". Mark undertook the walk to raise money for research into cancer, and as a tribute to a close friend and mentor who died of cancer in 2007. Proceeds from Mark's walk were distributed through cancer research organisations in each state he has walked through, namely the Children's Leukaemia and Cancer Research Foundation in Western Australia, the McGuinness/McDermott Foundation in South Australia, the Victorian Prostate Research Consortium, and the Australian Cancer Research Foundation in New South Wales.

Leigh Thomson-Mathews
Leigh set off from Perth on 8 March 2010 with his brother Sam. Sydney was their original destination, but the two decided to complete their journey in Melbourne, arriving on 3 July 2010.

Sam Thomson-Mathews
Sam set off from Perth on 8 March 2010 with his brother Leigh. Sydney was their original destination, but the two decided to complete their journey in Melbourne, arriving on 3 July 2010.

Mike Pauly
In 2011, then 71-year-old Mike Pauly walked from Melbourne to Perth to raise funds for Arthritis WA. This was Mike's second walk across Australia, having previously walked from Fremantle to Melbourne in 2009. Mike completed both journeys despite suffering from Osteoarthritis in both of his knee joints.

Jeff Johnson
Jeff Johnson walked 4791 km in 2011, and raised $68,000 for the Newborn and paediatric Emergency Transport Service (NETS) in the process. This was his second walk across Australia, having recently walked from north to south in 2007.

Jacob French
Jacob French walked across Australia in 2011–2012. He completed the walk wearing the white 'Storm Trooper' armour from George Lucas' Star Wars films, and raised $88,523 for the Starlight Children's Foundation in the process.

Andrew Cadigan
Andrew "Cad" Cadigan finished a solo walk from Sydney back to Sydney in June 2012. He walked unassisted via Tasmania, Melbourne, Adelaide, Albany, Perth, Broome, Darwin, Townsville, and Brisbane. Cadigan undertook the walk in honour of Chris Simpson, a friend who had died from complications related to myelodysplasia, and raised over $65,000 – $25,000 for The Cancer Council and $40,000 for the Leukemia Foundation. Tragically, shortly after completing the walk, whilst holidaying and recuperating in Thailand, Cadigan suffered head injuries in a motorcycle accident, and later died in hospital in Sydney, on 5 October 2012. A book, written by his author father Neil, about his walk and tragic death was released in 2014. The Leukemia Foundation has struck a research PHD into myelodysplasia, named in honour of Cadigan and Simpson, with a trust called Cad's Cause continuing to raise funds. The book is available through ozonfoot.com.au

Matt Napier
On 2 February 2013, Matt Napier set off from Perth to walk to Sydney via Adelaide, Melbourne, and Canberra to raise awareness of Global Poverty. Matt's walk was unique in that he bounced an AFL football the whole way to symbolise the important role sport plays in alleviating extreme poverty around the world. Matt went through 6 footballs on his trip and was assisted by his wife Wendy who was his support crew. They finished their 4,501 km journey in Sydney live on Channel Seven's Sunrise Program  on 28 June. The trip came on the back of Matt Cycling from Perth to Canberra (3908 km) the year before to also raise awareness about world poverty.

Brendon Alsop
On 21 February 2013, Brendon Alsop set off, with his dog Jojo, from Geelong to walk around Australia on the Fatmans Great Aussie Trek. Motivated to lose weight, Alsop walked unaided, pushing a pram, up the East Coast of Australia. With resources running out, he amended his destination to Cairns and completed his 4000 km trek when he dived into the Lagoon in Cairns on the morning of 3 January 2014. Losing 35 kg and raising $12000 for the Australian Cancer Research Foundation and the Andrew Love Cancer Centre in Geelong. Alsop dedicated his trek to friends and family members who had lost their lives to cancer. The trek was followed by his mother, Beth Alsop, who died of cancer 34 days after Alsop completed it.

Scott Loxley
On 2 November 2013, Scott left Melbourne and began walking solo around Australia covering every state and territory wearing a Star Wars Sandtrooper costume.

Scott Loxley officially crossed the finish line on Monday 15 June 2015 at the Monash Children's Hospital, after over 15,000 km of walking around Australia to raise funds which exceeded $110,000.

Gary Wilmot
Wilmot devised a plan for a run/walk between his home course at Canning River via Adelaide, Melbourne, Canberra, and Sydney, visiting other parkrun courses where practical and finish in South Bank, Queensland.

His aim to raise awareness and much-needed funds for the Heart Foundation was a success. His two-man support crew were Ben Sutton and Ols Nicholls.

Gary left Perth on 16 May 2015, and arrived in Brisbane on 17 September 2015 with a celebratory "free 5k run" taking place on 19 September.

John Olsen
John walked diagonally across Australia to honour the memory of his late wife Vida, and to raise awareness and funds for leukodystrophy which claimed her life in 2014.

John departed from Cape York Peninsula on 31 March 2016, and trekked diagonally across Australia through Alice Springs before finishing in Cape Leeuwin on Christmas Eve 2016.

In excess of $40k in donations was raised for Leukodystrophy Australia.

Ashok Alexander
Ashok Alexander, who is an IT professional and businessman by trade, decided to walk from Darwin to Canberra as part of his personal mission.  He walked pulling a trolley and had been self-sufficient with food, water and shelter.

He took about five and a half-month to cover a distance of 4,032km made of 5,771,768 steps to finally reached Canberra Parliament House on 27 September 2017, to coincide with his older son's birthday, who also walked with him the initial three days.

Tristan Harris
Tristan "Banger" Harris is an ex sailor serving over 27 years in the Royal Australian Navy as a Paramedic. He walked across Australia from Ocean to Ocean in 2017 raising funds for Legacy Australia. Departing on 1 May 2017 from HMAS Stirling, Garden Island WA completing the journey on 31 October 2017 at HMAS Creswell, Jervis Bay NSW he walked solo, carrying all food, water and shelter in a child walker. The walk took 184 days, walking 4,358km and raised over $15,500 for Legacy along the way.

Terra Roam
On 2 May 2018, Terra Roam became the first non-binary adventurer to walk 17,200km solo unsupported around Australia. It took 4 years in sections divided between seasons and injuries. The first section was a 1,250 km "warm up" lap around Tasmania carrying a backpack. The following 3 sections Roam pushed a custom built barrow they designed and named Dory, with a carrying capacity of 200L for the outback. When Roam reached the east coast they switched back to a backpack for the remaining distance to get away from roads and take the scenic tracks and paths through national parks, state forests and beaches. Not all their breaks were planned, when a truck driver tried running them down from behind on the Barkly Highway they took time off to recover from the trauma and adjusted their route to leave that region. When injuries to their feet and pelvic imbalance were beginning to cause blackouts they took a 6-month break for rehabilitation and after a fall broke and dislocated their ankle only 900km from completing their lap they were forced to take another 6 months off. Longest walking day was 67km, outback average was 45km/day, east coast average was 20km/day. 20 pairs of shoes including 5 pairs of thongs for 2,500km because they couldn't afford shoes. Hottest day was 45'C, coldest night was −5'C, most water drunk in one day was 10L. Roam walked through 2 cyclones, 2 floods, an earthquake, fires, fly plague, heatwaves and a blizzard, faced death threats from a stalker, fought off a wild dog attack and survived attempted murder.

Alwyn Dolan
For 12 months, Alwyn Doolan walked from Cape York in Queensland to Parliament House in Canberra with the intention of delivering a message to the federal government on reconciliation. After his 8,500-kilometre journey, Gooreng Gooreng and Wakka Wakka man Alywin Doolan hoped that he would pass on his message sticks to Prime Minister Scott Morrison. Unfortunately, his open invitation for the PM to meet with him was declined. Mr Doolan (at the time of writing) planned to walk back to Woorabinda in Central Queensland, roughly 1,500 km away, with three message sticks still in tow.

Bob Hanley
61-year-old Bob Hanley was of failing health and his doctor predicted that he would soon be confined to a wheelchair due to advanced spondylitis, with the prospects of not much more than six months to enjoy life at any level.  Rather than taking life easy as directed, Bob set out on a walk around Australia, pushing a wheelbarrow.  He was recognised by the Guinness Book of World Records as the holder of the record for the world's longest walk pushing a wheelbarrow, 14,500km in a few days longer than 3 years.

Marc Schinkel
Marc Schinkel completed his unassisted walk across Australia as a meditation practice inspired by the Buddhist monks of Mount Hiei. He tracked his daily efforts using a Garmin triathlon watch and uploaded the gps, heart rate as well as other biometric data to each point on a Google map for his family and friends to view as he progressed.

Marc was interviewed by Heather Ewart during his crossing of the Nullarbor Plain and appeared in the ABC's TV show Back Roads, Series 6 Episode 2, Nullarbor (Part 2) – Turning Back Time. He completed his walk with a 111km ultra-marathon from Northam to Cottlesloe Beach over the 1st and 2 November 2019  after failing to cross the continent twice before succeeding on his third attempt.

Ivor Houston
Ivor Houston walked solo and unsupported across Australia to raise money and awareness for refugees in Australia. Born and raised in the Blue Mountains and hosting a Malaysian family for the last 18 months, Ivor has a close experience with the problems Australians have at assisting refugees and asylum seekers. His fundraising was donated to Act for Peace and Blue Mountains Refugee Support Group. Ivor is also the youngest person recorded to have walked solo and unsupported across Australia at the age of 22 upon completion.

Further reading
 
 
 
 
 
 
 
 
 
 
 David Mason (2014). Walk Across Australia: The First Solo Crossing. Rosenberg Press

See also

List of long-distance hiking tracks in Australia
List of people who have run across Australia
List of people who have walked across Canada
List of people who have walked across the United States
Transcontinental walk
Twenty-first-century fundraising walks in Tasmania

References

Notes

* Steve Newman, Polly Letofsky and David Mason personally contributed information about their respective journeys in the creation of this article. Their contribution is received with thanks from the author of this article.

Walked across Australia
Walked across Australia
Australia Walkers
 Across